Jake Mathews (born Jacques Lagrandeur born March 14, 1971, in Sudbury, Ontario, Canada) is a Canadian country music singer, songwriter and performer.

Career
Jake's self-titled debut CD (Jake Mathews) garnered six nationally charted hits: "I’ll Do You One Better," "Try Again Tomorrow," "That's How Long," "Rush," "I’m Gone" and "There Ain't No Such Thing."

His second CD, Time After Time, released in 2004, was voted Best Album by Country Music News. Singles released from the album include the title track, "Signs of You Everywhere," "Kings for a Day" and "Arizona on My Mind."

Although he is the younger brother of Gil Grand, he has established a music career in his own right. In 2006, Mathews and Grand joined forces for "Raise the Roof," a tour that took them across Canada, raising awareness of Ronald McDonald House Charities.

Discography

Albums

Singles

Music videos

Awards and achievements
Western Country Music Awards
2005 – Nominated – Outstanding Country Recording for Time After Time
2003 – Nominated – Outstanding Country Recording for Jake Mathews

Country Music News 2004
Time After Time voted Best Album

Canadian Country Music Awards
2005 – Nominated – Independent Male Artist of the Year
2004 – Nominated – Independent Male Artist of the Year
2003 – Nominated – Rising Star Award
2002 – Nominated – Rising Star Award

Notes

References

External links

Jake Mathews Official

1971 births
Canadian male singer-songwriters
Canadian country singer-songwriters
Open Road Recordings artists
Musicians from Greater Sudbury
Living people
Franco-Ontarian people
21st-century Canadian male singers